Lysidice brevicalyx is a tree species in the genus Lysidice, endemic to China. It contains stilbenoid glycosides.

References

External links
 efloras.org

Detarioideae
Trees of China
Endemic flora of China